Smederevska Palanka is a town and municipality located in the Podunavlje District and the geographical region of Šumadija. According to the 2011 census, the town has 23,601, while the municipality has 50,284 inhabitants.

History
In the vicinity of the town there are two archaeological sites: Medvednjak, near Grčac, and Staro Selo, near Selevac. They belong to the end of Neolithic and early Eneolithic, or the period 4500-3500 BC, during the developed and ending phase of the Vinča culture when the first evidence of metallurgy appeared. The culture then disappears as the population presumably migrated. Findings from the later Hallstatt culture were also discovered. The most important artefacts, kept in the People's Museum in Smederevska Palanka, are the anthropomorphic figurines of high artistic and artisan value. One of the most valuable and considered unique is the one called "Woman in labor", due to its contracted position. In total, there are over 1,000 figurines, some complete, some damaged, but it is estimated that at least 3,000 of them are in personal collections.

There are also numerous finds from both Roman and Medieval periods. The most unusual of these finds is the cameo in two-layered onyx of Emperor Constantine I in full battle gear on a horse which was discovered near Kusadak, a village in the Smederevka Palanka municipality.

The town was first mentioned in 1021, in a written document currently preserved in St. Catherine's monastery in Egypt.

Climate
Smederevska Palanka has a humid subtropical climate (Köppen climate classification: Cfa).

Settlements
Apart from the town, the municipality of Smederevska Palanka includes the following settlements:

 Azanja (3946)
 Bačinac (688)
 Baničina (941)
 Bašin (442)
 Cerovac (1054)
 Glibovac (2096)
 Golobok (1988)
 Grčac (1094)
 Kusadak (4865)
 Mala Plana (803)
 Mramorac (553)
 Pridvorice (787)
 Ratari (1766)
 Selevac (3381)
 Stojačak (364)
 Vlaški Do (971)
 Vodice (881)

Demographics

As of 2011 census, the municipality has 50,284 inhabitants.

Ethnic groups
The ethnic composition of the municipality:

Society and culture

Culture
There are currently three Serbian Orthodox churches in Smederevska Palanka.

The oldest, the church of St. Elijah was built in 1827 and is one of the oldest wooden churches in Serbia. The town's Cathedral Church was built in 1902. The town's newest church, St. Petka, was built in 1997. The town's fourth Serbian orthodox church is under construction. Koporin Monastery, built in 1402 by Serbian prince Stefan Lazarević, lies just outside the town in Velika Plana.

Education
Smederevska Palanka has four elementary schools: Vuk Karadžić, Heroj Radmila Šišković, Heroj Ivan Muker and Olga Milošević. The town has three high schools: Palanka Gymnasium, Goša Technical School, and "Žikica Damjanović" Chemical and Medical School.

Smederevska Palanka has one local operating television station "Jasenica" and one newspaper "Palanačke" founded by journalist and writer Dejan Crnomarković.

Events
Annually every June, the town hosts the Best Fest Palanka, a rock festival featuring famous Serbian bands including Bajaga, Riblja čorba, Marčelo, Six pack band, Sunshine rap group and others.

Smederevska Palanka has one of Serbia's oldest annual traditional fairs, the Krstovdanski Vašar which has been held since 1834 when it was introduced by Prince Miloš Obrenović. During the fair, the town is visited by 100,000 to 150,000 tourists from surrounding towns and cities.

Smederevska Palanka hosts the "Motorijada", where thousands of bikers from Serbia and the former Yugoslavia assemble for the event and live concerts in Smederevska Palanka's Kiseljak. The 2011 event featured a famous Yugoslav band, Divlje Jagode.

Tourism
Beside archaeological findings and medieval monasteries, famous touristic spots in Smederevska Palanka include lake Kudreč, the Kiseljak spa complex and Mikulja forest.

Smederevska Palanka has a natural mineral water spring which is said to have been used since Roman times and has been used by the surrounding peoples since at least 1719. On 22 April 1907, the water from the mineral springs was awarded the golden medal for quality at the London 'Balkan Fair'.

According to some researchers, the town's mineral water is the 3rd best in Europe, primarily due to the natural selenium it contains.

Economy

Smederevska Palanka is an important industrial town, primarily due to the influence of manufacturing company Goša FOM which was among the biggest companies in the former Yugoslavia. The company produces trams, train wagons as well as prefabricated steel constructions.

Other industries and businesses based in Smederevska Palanka include "Karađorđe", a company which produces mineral water and juice, "Voćar Palanka" a food manufacturer and fruit supplier as well as "Opeka Palanka", bricks and building material manufacturer.

Additionally, Smederevska Palanka operates an Institute of Agriculture which researches seeds and vegetables.

The following table gives a preview of total number of registered people employed in legal entities per their core activity (as of 2018):

Transportation

Smederevska Palanka lies on A1 motorway, which is part of Pan-European Corridor X. It is also at the route of the Belgrade-Niš railway. The town's railway station was built in 1884.

Gallery

Notable people
Some of the notable people of Smederevska Palanka are:
 Stanoje Glavaš, First Serbian Uprising hero
 Miloje Popović Đak
 Vujica Vulićević
 Josip Broz Tito, statesman, lived in Smederevska Palanka and was employed as a metalworker here
 Vladimir Rakićević, researcher
 Živko Pavlović, general
 Perica Ognjenović, a football player
 Dejan Crnomarković, journalist and writer, founder and editor of the Palanačke newspaper  
 Miroslav Muta Nikolić, basketball player
 Nino Rešić, singer
 Zdenko Muf, a football player
 Radmila Milentijević, former minister
 Veljko Tatalović, zanatlija
 Pera Todorović, journalist
 Aranđel Markićević Minister of Justice 1994-1998
 Mina Milutinović, Miss World Next Top Model 2012
 Ivan Načković, Russian born, lives in Smederevska Palanka, musician
 Zoran Todorović Todor, academic painter and professor

International cooperation
Smederevska Palanka is twinned with Škofja Loka in Slovenia. Before the Yugoslav wars, the two towns had a joint art colony Groharjeva kolonija.

After the first World War, one street in the center of Smederevska Palanka was named Francuska, or French street while a street in the French city of Grenoble was named after Palanka as a way of celebrating the friendship between Serbia and France.

Twin towns

Smederevska Palanka is twinned with:
  Brčko, Bosnia and Herzegovina
  Škofja Loka, Slovenia

See also
 Municipalities of Serbia
 Cities and towns in Serbia
 Populated places of Serbia
 Smederevska Palanka Airport

References

External links 

 

Populated places in Podunavlje District
Municipalities and cities of Southern and Eastern Serbia